This is a list of public art in the Royal Borough of Kingston upon Thames.

Kingston

New Malden

Old Malden

Surbiton

Tolworth

References

Bibliography

External links
 

Kingston upon Thames
Kingston upon Thames
Tourist attractions in the Royal Borough of Kingston upon Thames